The huge moth family Noctuidae contains the following genera:

A B C D E F G H I J K L M N O P Q R S T U V W X Y Z

Cabralia
Cacofota
Cadiorapa
Caduca
Caecila
Caedesa
Caenurgia
Caeshadena
Caffristis
Calamia
Calamistis
Calanomogyna
Calesia
Calesidesma
Calesiodes
Calicula
Caligatus
Callargyra
Callegaria
Callhyccoda
Callicereon
Calliergis
Calligraphidia
Callingura
Calliocloa
Calliodes
Callipyris
Callistege
Callixena
Calloecia
Callophisma
Callopistria
Calloruza
Callostolis
Callostrotia
Callyna
Calocea
Calocestra
Calocharia
Calocucullia
Calogramma
Calophasia
Calophasidia
Caloplusia
Caloxestia
Calpiformis
Calpoparia
Calydia
Calymma
Calymnia
Calymniodes
Calymniops
Calyptis
Calyptra
Camphypena
Campometra
Camptocrossa
Camptylochila
Campydelta
Canatha
Canthylidia
Capelica
Caphornia
Capillamentum
Capis
Capitaria
Capnistis
Capnodes
Caradana
Caradjia
Caradrina
Carandana
Caranilla
Caranusca
Carbona
Carcharoda
Cardalena
Cardepia
Cardiestra
Cardiosace
Carelis
Carillade
Cariona
Carissa
Carmara
Caroga
Carpheria
Carpholithia
Carsina
Carteia
Carteris
Caryonopera
Casamba
Casandria
Casperia
Cassania
Castanasta
Catabapta
Catabena
Catada
Catadella
Catadoides
Catalana
Cataloxia
Catamecia
Catamelas
Catasema
Catephia
Catephiodes
Catephiona
Catoblemma
Catocala
Caularis
Cauninda
Cautaeschra
Cautatha
Cecharismena
Ceilodiastrophon
Celaena
Celagyris
Celeopsyche
Celiptera
Cellacrinata
Cenigria
Centrartha
Centrochlora
Centrogone
Cephalospargeta
Cephena
Ceramica
Cerapoda
Cerapteryx
Ceraptila
Cerastis
Cerathosia
Ceratostrotia
Cerbia
Cercosimma
Cerma
Cerocala
Ceroctena
Ceromacra
Cerviplusia
Cetola
Chabora
Chabuata
Chadaca
Chaetaglaea
Chaetoloma
Chaetostephana
Chalcamistis
Chalciope
Chalcoecia
Chalconyx
Chalcopasta
Chalenata
Chalestra
Chamaeclea
Chamyla
Chamyna
Chamyris
Chamyrisilla
Chandata
Chaograptis
Chara
Charanyca
Charanyctycia
Charierges
Charitosemia
Charmodia
Charoblemma
Chasmina
Chasminodes
Chazaria
Checupa
Cheillophota
Cheirophanes
Chelaprora
Chelecala
Chelichares
Cheligalea
Chelonomorpha
Chera
Chersotis
Chibidokuga
Chichimeca
Chilkasa
Chilodes
Chionoxantha
Chirconia
Chiripha
Chitasida
Chlanidophora
Chloantha
Chloridea
Chlorocleptria
Chlorocodia
Chlorognesia
Chlorograpta
Chlorothalpa
Chlorothrix
Chlumetia
Chobata
Chodda
Choephora
Choeropais
Cholimma
Choluata
Chopardiana
Chorizagrotis
Chorsia
Chortodes
Chrychrysia
Chrysanympha
Chrysodeixis
Chrysoecia
Chrysograpta
Chrysonicara
Chrysopera
Chrysorithrum
Chrysozonata
Chubutiana
Chuduca
Chusaris
Chutapha
Chytobrya
Chytolita
Chytonidia
Chytonix
Chytoryza
Ciasa
Cidariplura
Cilla
Cingalesa
Cirphis
Cirrhia
Cirrhobolina
Cirrhophanus
Cirrodes
Cirrodiana
Cirrodistis
Cirroedia
Cisaucula
Cissusa
Cladenia
Cladocerotis
Clapra
Clapronia
Clara
Clargia
Claterna
Claudaxylia
Clavipalpa
Clavipalpula
Clemathada
Cleoceris
Cleonymia
Cleophana
Cleptomita
Clethrorasa
Clina
Clinophlebia
Clitis
Cloniatarphes
Closteromorpha
Clytie
Clytomorpha
Clytoscopa
Cnodifrontia
Coarica
Cobalos
Cobubatha
Coccidiphaga
Cocytia
Cocytodes
Codalithia
Codonodes
Coelophoris
Coeloturatia
Coenagria
Coenipeta
Coenobela
Coenobia
Coenophila
Coenotoca
Coeriana
Cofimpacia
Cola
Colbusa
Coleta
Colnettia
Colobochyla
Colocasidia
Colodes
Colonsideridis
Colpocheilopteryx
Cometaster
Cometera
Comocrus
Comodoria
Complutia
Compsenia
Compsotata
Conacontia
Concana
Condate
Condica
Conicochyta
Conicofrontia
Conicophoria
Conisania
Conistra
Conochares
Conochuza
Conocrana
Conosema
Conscitalypena
Conservula
Consobrambus
Constantargyris
Constantiodes
Contortivena
Convercala
Copablepharon
Copanarta
Cophanta
Copibryophila
Copicucullia
Copidryas
Copifrontia
Copihadena
Copipanolis
Copiphana
Copitarsia
Copitype
Copivaleria
Coptocnemia
Coranarta
Corcobara
Coremagnatha
Corethrobela
Corgatha
Corgathalia
Coria
Corisce
Corna
Cornutifera
Cornutiplusia
Coronta
Cororthosia
Corrha
Corsa
Cortyla
Corubia
Coruncala
Corynitis
Corythurus
Coscaga
Cosmia
Cosmodes
Cosmophila
Costankia
Cotanda
Cotarsina
Cotuza
Coxina
Craccaphila
Crambiforma
Crambodes
Crambophilia
Crambopsis
Crameria
Cranionycta
Craniophora
Craptignapa
Crasia
Crassagrotis
Crassivesica
Craterestra
Cremnophora
Crenularia
Cretonia
Crimona
Crinala
Crinisinus
Crinocula
Crioa
Crionica
Criophasia
Cristatopalpus
Crithote
Crochiphora
Crocigrapha
Cromobergia
Cropia
Crosia
Cruria
Cruriopsis
Crusiseta
Cryassa
Crymodes
Crymona
Cryphia
Cryphioides
Cryphiomima
Crypsedra
Crypsiprora
Crypsotidia
Cryptastria
Cryptocala
Cryptochrostis
Cryptochrysa
Cryptomeria
Cteipolia
Ctenoceratoda
Ctenoplusia
Ctenostola
Ctenusa
Ctenypena
Ctypansa
Cuahtemoca
Cubena
Cucullia
Cuculluna
Culasta
Culicula
Cultripalpa
Cuneisigna
Cuphanoa
Cupreosotis
Curubasa
Curvatula
Cutina
Cyathissa
Cyclodes
Cyclopera
Cyclopis
Cycloprora
Cycloprosopus
Cyclopteryx
Cydosia
Cyligramma
Cymatophoropsis
Cymoblemma
Cymodegma
Cymonia
Cymosafia
Cyphocampa
Cyptonychia
Cyrebia
Cyrima
Cyrtandra
Cytocanis
Cytothymia
Cyttaralopha

References 

 Natural History Museum Lepidoptera genus database

 
Noctuid genera C